Catalan Communist Party was a political party in Catalonia, Spain. PCC was founded in 1928. It had its origins in l'Ateneu Enciclopèdic Popular, which had been formed in 1926, and in the Marxist sectors of the Catalan separatist movement. The main leaders of PCC were Jordi Arquer and Víctor Colomer.

History
The PCC was founded in 1928 by the communist sector of the Catalan independence movement. The party was relatively small, having around 300 members, mainly in Lleida and Barcelona. In November 1930 PCC merged into the Catalan-Balearic Communist Federation (FCCB).

Newspapers
The party published L'Opinió (1928-1929), and later L'Andreuenc and Treball.

References

Defunct communist parties in Catalonia
1928 establishments in Spain
Political parties established in 1928
1930 disestablishments in Spain
Political parties disestablished in 1930